The Goode Family (sometimes abbreviated to Goode Family) is a short-lived American adult animated television sitcom that originally aired on ABC from May 27 to August 7, 2009. The series was created by Mike Judge, the creator of MTV's Beavis and Butt-Head and Fox's King of the Hill, and follows the life of an environmentally responsible but obsessive family. The series takes a comic look at contemporary society, this time focusing on a liberal family instead of King of the Hills conservative family. Judge created the show along with former King of the Hill writers John Altschuler and David Krinsky. The show was cancelled after its first season on August 8, 2009.

The series was released on DVD format on January 8, 2013 by Shout! Factory.

Premise
The Goode family struggles with the modern social and environmental responsibilities of being liberals, and the paradoxes that arise for a working-class family when trying to be politically correct all of the time about everything. Situations in the first episode included shopping at a natural foods store, not having brought reusable bags, how to refer to ethnic groups, analyzing conservative beliefs they typically despise, and raising modern teenagers. The pilot satirized both stereotypical "liberal" and "conservative" mindsets, including the ongoing derangement of the family's "vegan" dog (who has taken to eating neighborhood pets).

Characters

Main characters
 Gerald Goode (voiced by Mike Judge) – An administrator at a community college. He comes from a "long line of over-educated academic liberals". He rides a bicycle for transportation to protect the environment, and his trademark clothing is a cycling uniform. He is very fastidious and easily disgusted, both by animals and people. His voice and character traits resemble those of the David Van Driessen character from Mike Judge's earlier series Beavis and Butt-head.
 Helen Goode (voiced by Nancy Carell) – Gerald's wife. A local activist who has "daddy issues". She is concerned about her social status among the other eco-conscious people in Greenville, and often tries to impress the wealthy wife of Gerald's boss.

 Ubuntu Goode (voiced by David Herman) – The Goodes' adopted son, named after Ubuntu, a concept from African philosophy (mispronounced by the characters as  instead of ). The Goodes adopted him in the name of promoting racial tolerance within the community, but due to their vagueness in filling out the adoption paperwork, the family ended up with a white South African baby instead of the black infant they wanted, but decided to keep him because it was an interesting challenge to raise a "racist born" white baby as a liberal adult. Ubuntu is often shown conflicted with a seemingly innate desire to go against his parents' lifestyle; however, rather than being an outright rebellion, this seems to reflect the nature and nurture controversy. He sleeps in footy pajamas that are decorated with big rig trucks. Despite his seemingly idiotic and unaware nature, he is really accomplished at both sports and machinery; he is a member of his high school's football team. 
 Bliss Goode (voiced by Linda Cardellini) – Helen and Gerald's biological daughter. One of the characters with a sense of reason, she often disagrees with and mocks her parents' political stances, about which she is usually better-informed. She serves as the show's chief foil by poking holes in Gerald's and Helen's world view. In later episodes, she has tended to agree with her parents, and in some instances has usually helped them to achieve a common goal.
 Che (voiced by Dee Bradley Baker) – The family's dog, named after the communist revolutionary Che Guevara. The Goodes feed him vegan food which he dislikes. He craves meat and often eats neighborhood animals and pets. As a consequence, "missing" flyers of neighborhood pets blanket street poles.
 Charlie (voiced by Brian Doyle-Murray) – Helen's politically incorrect SUV-driving father who mostly likes making fun of her lifestyle. He frequently ridicules Gerald and Helen for their beliefs, although he seems to favor Ubuntu more due to him being involved in the football team, and Bliss who seems to share his opinions.

Other characters
 Kent Jensen (voiced by David Herman) – Gerald's boss at Greenville Community College, and Margo's husband.
 Kiki (voiced by Amy Hill) – The Goodes' next-door neighbor, 41 years old.
 Margo Jensen (voiced by Julia Sweeney) – Helen's arrogant rival who relentlessly puts down the Goodes (but mostly just Helen), 45 years old. She is an influential member of the Greenville community and embodies everything Helen wants to be, while at odds with Helen and vice versa. Helen seems to mostly get the best of her, and her purpose is to show the type of person who is holier-than-thou while being a faux personality who seizes on fads to increase her social standing.
 Penny (voiced by Lori Nasso) – A neighbor who is single and childless, and makes occasional comments about her loneliness and desire to have children. Her beliefs fluctuate, and she will take liberal causes only to abandon them shortly afterwards to her personal benefit.
 Ray Johnson (voiced by Gary Anthony Williams) – An easy-going, country music-loving black neighbor of the Goodes who drives a gas-guzzling car and thinks of race as less important than the Goodes do, as an unexpected device. 43 years old.
 Mo (voiced by Laraine Newman) – A lesbian the Goodes are friends with, along with her partner, Trish. Mo worked on an oil rig and is 47 years old.
 Solosolo (voiced by Phil LaMarr) – Football quarterback at Greenville High School, and son of Kiki, 17 years old.
 Souki (voiced by Cree Summer) – A lesbian, 40 years old.
 Jenn (voiced by Grey DeLisle) – Another lesbian, and Souki's partner. 41 years old.
 Treyvon (voiced by David Herman) – A teenage employee at One Earth, an organic supermarket frequented by the Goodes, Margo and Greenville's Liberal elite (the store is frequently seen featuring a large sign telling its shoppers what is good and what is bad; Farm-Raised Catfish constantly moving between good and bad). Treyvon is also an amateur filmmaker whom Bliss tries to befriend. He comes across as a suburbanite that thinks it is "cool" to make fun of others with illiberal beliefs.
 Mr. Heelo (voiced by Howard Kremer) – The manager of the "One Earth" supermarket, 38 years old.
 Trish (voiced by Julia Sweeney) – Trish is Mo's partner.
 The Average Guy (voiced by Mike Judge or David Herman) - A newscaster that does stories from the average point of view.
 Maffew (voiced by Phil LaMarr) – Leader of a gang of thugs.
 Dawn (voiced by Tara Strong) – Female member of Maffew's gang, 16 years old.
 Other Two Thugs  (voiced by Phil LaMarr and David Herman) – Members of Maffew's gang.
 Principal Whitmore (voiced by Phil LaMarr) – Principal at Greenville Community College.
 Mrs. Glavin (voiced by Tara Strong) – Teacher at Greenville Community College.
 Tanya (voiced by Cree Summer) – Greenville Community College student who is in model congress.
 Isabelle (voiced by Laraine Newman) – Duncan's wife.
 Professor Mead (voiced by Elvis Costello) – Teacher at Oxford University, 45 years old.
 Michelle (voiced by Alyson Hannigan) – Director of community service at Greeneville Community College, 25 years old.
 Jeff (voiced by Diedrich Bader) – Teacher at Greenville Community College.
 Duncan (voiced by Gary Anthony Williams) – Isabelle's husband.
 Benny (voiced by David Herman) – Victim of the rival drug dealers.

Crew
The show is created by Mike Judge, John Altschuler, and Dave Krinsky, with Altschuler and Krinsky serving as show runners. The show is directed by John Rice, Seth Kearsley, Jennifer Coyle, and Anthony Chun, with Wes Archer as supervising director. Show writers include Jonathan Collier, Jace Richdale, Gene Hong, Owen Ellickson, Dave Jeser, Franklin Hardy, Leila Strachan, Brad Pope, Howard Kremer, Shane Kosakowski, Jordana Arkin, and Matt Silverstein, in addition to Altschuler and Krinsky, and other writers.

Episodes

Season 1 (2009)

Future ideas and concepts
While the show is still officially canceled, Media Rights Capital ordered an additional 10 episode scripts, which is customary in prime time television in order to get a show immediately back into production in time if another season is ordered. Showrunners John Altschuler and Dave Krinsky have mentioned these ideas for possible future episodes:

 Bliss asserts her own identity further. John and Dave believe she can become funnier.
 Brian "Bri-Bri" Kennedy may return as a greedy businessman who convinces Helen and Gerald that his schemes are "for the Earth and stuff."
 More plots involving Mo and Trish, and their enemies Jen and Suki.

Cancellation
On August 8, 2009, ABC Entertainment President Steve McPherson explained that the show, along with Surviving Suburbia, had officially been canceled due to low ratings.

On November 1, 2009, Mike Judge announced that ABC was not interested in a second season of The Goode Family, despite its success. In 2009, the series ended on August 7, 2009 after the season one episode "A Goode Man is Hard to Find".

In 2010, reruns of The Goode Family aired Monday nights at 10pm on Comedy Central, beginning January 4. It was to be evaluated for new episodes. It departed the network's primetime schedule after four weeks, returning occasionally in low-trafficked timeslots.

Reception
When first airing, the show received mixed reviews. A reviewer for the Los Angeles Times said: "The Goode Family, which is nicely acted and well animated, works best when the cultural potshots give way to the more basic human needs of its characters: a mother's desire to be close to her daughter, or to her father (Brian Doyle-Murray as the resident voice of political incorrectness), in spite of "a lifetime of crippling negative comments," and a father's willingness to go outside his comfort zone to make his son happy, as when Ubuntu joins the football team. There's a show there." A reviewer for NJ.com said: The Goode Family feels as if you are being dropped into a foreign land without any kind of guide, or even map." A reviewer for The New York Times said: "Mr. Judge, who remains obsessed with the absurdities of political correctness, still has his head very much in the Clinton years, and it is possible to watch The Goode Family feeling so thoroughly transported back to another time that you wonder where all the Monica Lewinsky jokes went. Sometimes you’ve just got to grab your cup of fair-trade coffee and move on."

See also 
 Adult animation
 Mike Judge

References

External links 

 Official website
The Goode Family at Amazon.com
 The Goode Family at facebook.com
 
 
 SitcomsOnline Review of The Goode Family

Further reading
 

2000s American adult animated television series
2000s American sitcoms
2009 American television series debuts
2009 American television series endings
American Broadcasting Company original programming
American adult animated comedy television series
American animated sitcoms
Animated television series about families
English-language television shows
Television series by Film Roman
Television series by 3 Arts Entertainment
Television series by Media Rights Capital
Television series created by Dave Krinsky
Television series created by John Altschuler
Television series created by Mike Judge
Vegetarianism in fiction